The inaugural Singapore Grand Prix was held from 9 to 11 April 1966, on the Thomson Road Grand Prix circuit. Previous editions of the Grand Prix were held before Singapore gained its independence, and were not called Singapore Grand Prix. The 1965 Malaysian Grand Prix was held on the same course, as part of the Malaysian Grand Prix event, as the 1966 Grand Prix of Singapore.

Results
1966 1ST SINGAPORE GRAND PRIX
Thomson Road Grand Prix circuit
9–11 April 1966

References
 from the MISAS (Moving Image and Sound Archives Singapore) website

See also
 2008 Singapore Grand Prix, the first modern Singapore GP, and first F1 GP in Singapore
 1999 Malaysian Grand Prix, the first F1 GP in Malaysia

Singapore Grand Prix
Singapore Grand Prix, 1966
April 1966 sports events in Asia